Gary Kelly may refer to:

Gary C. Kelly (born 1955), CEO of Southwest Airlines
Gary Kelly (footballer, born 1966), Irish football goalkeeper
Gary Kelly (footballer, born 1974), Irish footballer
Gary Kelly (bowls) (born 1989), Northern Irish bowls player
Gary Kelly (politician) (born 1962), American politician from Missouri

See also
Garry Kelly (1948–2002), Australian politician